The NSF Engineering Research Center for Wireless Integrated Microsystems (ERC WIMS) was formed in 2000 in Michigan — through the collaboration of the University of Michigan (UM), Michigan State University (MSU), and Michigan Technological University.

The center is funded by the National Science Foundation. Additional contributions came from the state of Michigan, the three partnering core universities, other federal agencies, and a consortium of about twenty companies.

Purpose
The center researches innovations for  wireless integrated microsystemss. The ERC WIMS works on merging micropower circuits, wireless interfaces, biomedical, and environmental sensors and subsystems, and advanced packaging to create microsystems that will have a pervasive impact on society during the next two decades.

The partnership combined UM's programs in sensors and microsystems with MSU's leadership in materials, especially in diamond and in carbon nanotubes, and Michigan Tech's expertise in packaging, micromilling, and hot embossing.

See also

External links
NSF Engineering Research Center for Wireless Integrated Microsystems at the University of Michigan

Engineering research institutes
Science and technology in Michigan
Michigan State University
Michigan Technological University
University of Michigan
Economy of Metro Detroit
Wireless network organizations
Research institutes established in 2000
2000 establishments in Michigan